The Sahaj Paath or Sadharan Path is the reading from beginning to end, with no time-limit for completion. of the Sri Guru Granth Sahib, the Sikh Scriptures, which can be done at the reader's schedule. A Paath may be fulfilled by one or more readers, and the pace depends entirely on those reading.

Fulfilling the Paath can be done in honor of a particular occasion or simply to increase one’s feeling of connection to the Guru. When done monthly, it gives the Sadh Sangat Congregation a beautiful opportunity to establish a close relationship with the Guru and provides the blessing of His Word to the community.

Now there are also a lot of sehaj paath apps which give convenience to proceed with sehaj paath any time and any where.

See also
Akhand Paath

References 

Sikh practices